Austria sent delegation to compete at the 2010 Winter Paralympics, in Vancouver. It fielded a total of nineteen athletes, in alpine skiing, biathlon and cross-country skiing.

Alpine skiing 

Seventeen athletes participated in the Alpine Ski competitions, with all of the medalists winning medals in the ski events. The medalists are: 

  Claudia Loesch, Women's Super-G, sitting
  Claudia Loesch, Women's Slalom, sitting
  Sabine Gasteiger, Women's Slalom, visually impaired
  Claudia Loesch, Women's Super Combined, sitting
  Sabine Gasteiger, Women's Giant Slalom, visually impaired
  Robert Meusburger, Men's Giant Slalom, standing
  Jurgen Egle, Men's Super Combined, sitting
  Claudia Loesch, Women's Downhill, sitting
  Hubert Mandl, Men's Super-G, Standing
  Philipp Bonadimann, Men's Super Combined, sitting
  Philipp Bonadimann, Men's Slalom, sitting

Biathlon

Cross-country skiing

See also
Austria at the 2010 Winter Olympics
Austria at the Paralympics

References

External links
Vancouver 2010 Paralympic Games official website
International Paralympic Committee official website

Nations at the 2010 Winter Paralympics
2010
Paralympics